The narrow-headed whipsnake (Demansia angusticeps) is a species of venomous snake in the family Elapidae native to Western Australia.

References

Demansia
Snakes of Australia
Reptiles described in 1888
Reptiles of Western Australia